Josh Dean may refer to:
 Josh Dean (actor), Canadian actor and improvisor
 Josh Dean (writer), American journalist and author
 Josh Dean (American football), American football coach and player